Paran was a South Korean boyband formed by NH Media in 2005. The five members of the band had been living together for two years while being trained in singing and dancing. Being fluent in English and Japanese, the band has targeted for overseas markets from debut. Plus all the members have been trained in all areas of musical production from chorus, dubbing to sub-producing. The group unofficially disbanded after members had left for the army and Ryan and Ace released solo singles along with AJ joining U-KISS.

Discography

Albums 

 Hold My Breath (2005)
 Beyond The Blue Sky (2006)
 U.R.M.S (2008)

Singles 

 "The First"
 "Merry Christmas"

Awards

References

South Korean pop music groups
South Korean boy bands